Mathieu Clobert (born 8 January 1992 in Brussels, Belgium) is a Belgian singer-songwriter, composer and poet.

Biography 
Mathieu Clobert studied guitar for seven years and wrote his first lyrics at 11 years.
In 2010, he won the competition for best young talent at Les Francofolies de Spa who revealed Suarez. With this award, he opened concerts by Gérald de Palmas and edited an EP MaTheO EP by the stage name Matheo.

In 2012, he met the producer Watch De Schutter and composed his first album Des poètes maudits.

In 2014, Mathieu changed his stage name to Mathieu Clobert. His new album was produced by Nicolas d'Avell : DHDT and he was invited once again to Les Francofolies de Spa. He was also a finalist in Révélation NRJ 2014.

 Style 
Mathieu is inspired by Damien Saez, Fabrice Mauss, Dominique A, Michel Polnareff, Hans Zimmer. After a first album with dark and poetics lyrics, he tries to mix pop music and soundtrack movie.

 Discographie 

 Albums 
 2011 : MaTheO EP 2012 : Des poètes maudits 2013 : Des paradis perdus, EP
 2014 : DHDT 2014 : Brave shadows, EP
 2016 : Mathieu Clobert, EP
 2022 : Sans retour, EP

 Armor 
 2017 : Je n'ai pas les yeux des Hommes, EP
 2018 : La bête est morte, EP

 Singles 
 2011 : Orland 2012 : Je débloque 2013 : Des paradis perdus 2013 : Psychodrame 2014 : Changer de monde 2017 : Garde-moi 2021 : Rédemption''

Award 
 2010 : Best young talent at Les Francofolies de Spa

Nomination 
 2014 : Révélation NRJ 2014

References

External links 
 Official site

1992 births
Living people
Belgian composers
Male composers
Belgian rock musicians
21st-century Belgian male singers
21st-century Belgian singers